Rosette is the fifth studio album by Japanese singer Shizuka Kudo. It was released on April 4, 1990, through Pony Canyon. Initially titled Mysterious II, Rosette is Kudo's first album to be entirely arranged by Tsugutoshi Gotō and his band members, credited under the name Draw4. The limited first pressing of the album came in a special box packaging. Rosette was re-released in APO-CD format on December 1, 1993.

Commercial performance
Rosette debuted at number one on the Oricon Albums Chart, with 125,000 copies sold in its first week. The album dropped to number two the following week, with 44,000 copies sold. It fell eight positions to number ten on its third charting week, selling 24,000 copies. It hovered around the top ten for the following four weeks before dropping out from the top twenty on its eight charting week. Rosette stayed in the top 100 for eleven weeks, selling a reported total of 265,000 copies during its run. The album ranked at number 48 on the year-end Oricon Albums Chart.

Track listing
All music composed by Tsugutoshi Gotō; all tracks arranged by Draw4.

Charts

Certification

Release history

See also
 List of Oricon number-one albums

References

1990 albums
Shizuka Kudo albums
Pony Canyon albums